Some of the Iranian national symbols are listed as below:

Official symbols

Flag

Emblem 
 Derafsh Kaviani
 Lion and Sun

Anthem 
 Salām-e Shāh
 Imperial Anthem of Iran
 Ey Iran
 Payandeh Bada Iran

Unofficial symbols

Cultural heritage

Musical instruments
SanturSetar
Tar
Kamancheh
Ney-anban
Chang
Daf

Festivals
Nowruz
13 Be-Dar
Tirgan
Mehregan
Yalda
Sadeh
Chaharshanbe Suri

BooksAvestaShahnamehMasnaviDivan of HafezGulistanBustan''

Myths
Keyumars
Mashya and Mashyana
Jamshid
Arash
Rostam
Zahhak
Fereydun
Huma bird (griffin)
Simorgh
Chamrosh

Monuments
Pasargadae
Naqsh-e Jahan Square
Azadi Square
Milad Tower
Persepolis
Rostam's Mural
Rudkhan Castle

Games
Chess (Shatranj)
Backgammon (Nard)
Hokm
Shelem

Architectural elements
Persian gardens
Windcatcher
Qanat

Sports
Wrestling
Pahlevani and zoorkhaneh rituals
Polo

Arts
Persian calligraphy
Persian carpet
Persian literature
Persian miniature

Colors
Persian green
Persian blue
Persian red

Dishes
Chelo kabab
Ghorme sabzi
Fesenjan
Abgoosht 
Salad Shirazi

Natural

Animals
Persian/Asiatic lion
Asiatic cheetah	
Persian leopard
Persian cat
Persian fallow deer
Caspian horse

Flowers

Lotus
Rose
Saffron
Hyacinth
Tulip
Lily

Inanimate objects

Royal stars
Alborz Kuh
Mount Damavand
Persian Gulf
Persepolis
Azadi Tower
Milad Tower
Cypress

Birds
Nightingale
Falcon
Shahbaz (Fable)

Fruits
Pomegranate

Others
Saffron
Pistachio
Caviar

Public figures

Poets
Ferdowsi
Hafez 
Saadi
Rumi
Attar of Nishapur
Nizami 
Omar Khayyam 
Naser Khosrow

References

Symbols
Iran national symbols